InsideCounsel magazine is a U.S.-based business-to-business monthly trade publication

History and profile
Founded in 1991, InsideCounsel has since been targeting top in-house legal professionals. It was formerly named Corporate Legal Times.

The magazine's coverage includes benchmarking surveys, examinations of substantive legal issues, regional news, and a variety of columns and departments covering areas such as litigation, corporate governance, labor, and intellectual property. In 2007 the publisher of the magazine, Wicks Business Information, was acquired by Summit Business Media. The magazine is headquartered in Chicago, Illinois.

Cathleen Flahardy served as the editor-in-chief of the magazine. In September 2013 Erin Harrison was appointed to the post.

Circulation for InsideCounsel, audited by the BPA 6/10 40,000.

References

External links

1991 establishments in Illinois
Business magazines published in the United States
Monthly magazines published in the United States
Legal magazines
Magazines established in 1991
Magazines published in Chicago
Professional and trade magazines